A rookery is a colony of breeding birds and some marine mammals.

Rookery may also refer to:

 Rookery (slum), a term for a city slum, building, or ghetto frequented by poor people, criminals and prostitutes
 Rookery Building, a historic landmark located in the Loop neighborhood of Chicago
 Rookery Hall, an Elizabethan-style mansion located near the village of Worleston, Cheshire
 Rookery Hill, a football stadium in Thurrock, Essex
 Rookery Islands, Holme Bay, Mac.Robertson Land, Antarctica
 Rookery Lake, Vestfold Hills, Princess Elizabeth Land, Antarctica
 Rookery Mound, an archaeological site near Everglades City, Florida
 Rookery railway station, a former railway station in Rainford, Lancashire, England
 Rookery, an album by Giant Rooks
 The Rookery, Nantwich, a Georgian townhouse in Nantwich, Cheshire
 The Rookery, Stoke-on-Trent
 The Rookery, Tattenhall, a house in Tattenhall, Cheshire

See also

 
 
 
 Rockery (disambiguation)
 Rook (disambiguation)
 Rookery Nook (disambiguation)
 Rookie (disambiguation)